Abyssochitonidae is a family of chitons belonging to the order Lepidopleurida.

Genera:
 Ferreiraella Sirenko, 1988

References

Chitons